The Spring Racing Carnival is the name of an Australian Thoroughbred horse racing series held annually in Melbourne during October and November.

The Carnival and its status in the wider community
Although racing in Australia is held every day except Good Friday and Christmas Day, the Group One races in Melbourne are held almost exclusively throughout the carnival, which is traditionally placed between the football and cricket seasons.  During the winter (where football is dominant), and summer (where cricket is dominant), racing takes a 'back seat' position in relation to the cricket or football in terms of media coverage and attendances.  However, in spring and autumn, the mass media turns its attention to the racing.  There is also an Autumn Racing Carnival, a time where Group One races are also held.

Attendance

Sweeps
The carnival, and particularly the Melbourne Cup attracts the interest of many people otherwise uninterested in horse racing, and special forms of very low-stake gambling are often used for this event.  One common form for groups such as office staff is the "sweep", where each participant adds a small fee to a "pot" and draws the name of a horse like a raffle.  Prize money is distributed to the person who draws the winning horse (occasionally smaller prizes are awarded to placegetters and the last-placing horse).  A more complex and high-stakes form of the sweep is the "Calcutta", often held as a fundraising event for community organisations, which begins as in the sweep (though usually with a much higher initial stake), but which allows ticket holders to trade their tickets through an auction system.

Special guests
For the fashion part of the Spring Racing Carnival many special guests over the years have come to the races.
Paris Hilton, Nicky Hilton, Carson Kressley, Eva Longoria, Sarah Jessica Parker, Kim Cattrall, Naomi Campbell, Nicole Kidman, Gigi Hadid and Hilary Swank.

Carnival race meetings
The Spring Racing Carnival is made up of meetings held by the metropolitan clubs, where Group One races take place, and also at Geelong and Bendigo. With numerous group races during August and September at metropolitan tracks Flemington, Caulfield and Moonee Valley, the Spring Racing Carnival officially starts on the Group 1 Turnbull Stakes Day at Flemington, one week after the AFL Grand Final. The Spring Racing Carnival officially ends on the final day of the carnival at Sandown in mid-November.

Caulfield Carnival

The Melbourne Racing Club holds three race meetings at Caulfield Racecourse, each with major Group one races.
 The Caulfield Guineas, Caulfield Thousand Guineas and Caulfield Stakes is held on the Saturday three weeks before the Victoria Derby.  Other group races are held on this day, including the Toorak Handicap and Herbert Power Stakes.
 The Ladies Day Vase and Blue Sapphire Stakes are held on the Wednesday following the Saturday Caulfield Guineas.
 The Caulfield Cup is held on the Saturday on the weekend following the Guineas meeting.

Geelong Carnival

The Geelong Racing Club hosts its Group 3 Geelong Cup at the Geelong Racecourse on the Wednesday between the Caulfield Cup and Cox Plate. The meeting also has a couple of Listed races, The 3YO Geelong Classic and The Rosemont Stud Stakes. The day is a public holiday in Geelong's metropolitan area.

Moonee Valley Carnival
The Moonee Valley Racing Club holds a two-day carnival at the Moonee Valley Racecourse. The Manikato Stakes is held on the Friday night following the Caulfield Cup.  
The club's highlight is the Weight for Age Cox Plate race held on the next day with a host of other Group races including the Moonee Valley Gold Cup, Crystal Mile and Moonee Valley Vase.

Bendigo Carnival

The Bendigo Jockey Club hosts its Group 3 Bendigo Cup on the Wednesday between the Cox Plate and the VRC Derby Day.

Melbourne Cup Carnival

The Victoria Racing Club's meetings attract the most attention from the media and the wider community.
 The Victoria Derby is held on the Saturday before the Melbourne Cup.  It is a set-weights race for three-year-old horses.  Other well known races on this day include the Cantala Stakes, Empire Rose Stakes and Hotham Handicap (the winner of this receiving a final spot in the Melbourne Cup field). Traditionally, the Melbourne Cup field is announced following the conclusion of the last race on this day.
 The Melbourne Cup handicap race is held on the first Tuesday in November, and is a public holiday in Melbourne, but the Cup is witnessed by those all around Australia as well as internationally.
 The VRC Oaks race is held on the Thursday following the Cup. It is a three-year-old fillies race, and traditionally the race meeting has been known as 'ladies' day'.
 The Mackinnon Stakes is held on the Saturday following the Oaks, and traditionally it has been known as 'family day'. Other notable races run on this day are the VRC Sprint Classic and VRC Queen Elizabeth Stakes.

Sandown Carnival

The Melbourne Racing Club holds the last official meeting of the Spring Racing Carnival at Sandown Racecourse. This day includes the Group 2 Sandown Guineas and the Group 2 Zipping Classic and occurs in mid November, one week after Mackinnon Stakes day.

References

Notes

Bibliography

External links
VRC Homepage (Official)
RVL Spring Racing Carnival (Official)

Annual sporting events in Australia
Horse racing in Australia
Horse racing meetings
Sport in Melbourne
Carnivals in Australia
Equestrian festivals
Spring (season) events in Australia